The mixed relay ski mountaineering competition at the 2020 Winter Youth Olympics was held on 14 January at the Villars Winter Park.

Results 
The race was started at 10:30.

References

Mixed relay